Ernest Benjamin 'Tich' Utting (31 October 1897 – 21 November 1948) was an Australian rules footballer who played for the Collingwood Football Club and Hawthorn Football Club in the Victorian Football League (VFL).

Family
The tenth of thirteen children born to Thomas Edward Utting (1862–1942) and Emily Esther Utting (1863–1943), nee Bartley, Ernest Benjamin Utting was born at Collingwood on 31 October 1897.

War service
In 1915, shortly before turning 18, Utting enlisted to serve in World War I. After completing training at Broadmeadows and then serving for five months overseas, Utting was returned to Australia from Egypt after he was diagnosed with a heart condition.

Football
Ern Utting started his football career with the Collingwood District in the Victorian Junior Football League. Success as a forward in that team led to his selection by the Collingwood VFL (senior) team but he struggled to get consistent game time in what was a strong side, although he managed to top their goalkicking in 1920 with 23 goals. After four years with Collingwood he left the club and joined Hawthorn who were then in the Victorian Football Association (VFA). 

Utting played for two seasons with Hawthorn in the VFA and was a member of Hawthorn's inaugural VFL side when they joined that competition in 1925. The Club Champion in 1927 and 1929, Utting was also the first Hawthorn footballer to play 100 VFL games. Playing mainly in the back pocket, he polled well in the Brownlow Medal during his career and finished in the top 10 on three occasions. He left the senior side at the end of 1932 but captained the seconds side in 1933, winning the Gardiner Medal for the reserve league's best and fairest player.

Death
Utting died suddenly at his home in Hawthorn in 1948 and is buried at the Melbourne General Cemetery.

Honours and achievements
Individual
 2× Hawthorn best and fairest: 1927, 1929
 Collingwood leading goalkicker: 1920
 Hawthorn Hall of Fame
 Hawthorn life member

References

External links

Ern Utting's playing statistics from The VFA Project

1897 births
1948 deaths
Australian rules footballers from Melbourne
Collingwood Football Club players
Hawthorn Football Club (VFA) players
Hawthorn Football Club players
Peter Crimmins Medal winners
People from Collingwood, Victoria
Australian military personnel of World War I
Military personnel from Melbourne
Burials at Melbourne General Cemetery